Ereen  is a settlement in the Bayan-Uul sum (district) of Dornod Province in eastern Mongolia.

Populated places in Mongolia